William Kevin Donley (born July 4, 1951) is an American football coach and former player. In the spring of 2021 (a delayed start to their 2020 season due to the COVID pandemic), Donley began his 42nd championship season as a head coach in addition to the 1997 season which was devoted to establishing the football program at the University of Saint Francis. Donley was named head coach there in April 1997. The Saint Francis Cougars began play in the 1998 season; thus, the 2020 championship season marks Donley's 23nd season since the program's inception.

Donley currently holds the NAIA record for most wins by a NAIA football coach.

Prior to Saint Francis, Donley served as the head coach at Anderson University in Anderson, Indiana (1978–1981), Georgetown College in Georgetown, Kentucky (1982–1992), and California University of Pennsylvania (1993–1996).

Donley's 2016 and 2017 Saint Francis Cougars teams won back-to-back NAIA championships, and his 1991 Georgetown Tigers team won the NAIA Division II Football National Championship. In addition to the 2016 and 2017 championships, Donley led Saint Francis to three consecutive NAIA title game appearances from 2004 to 2006.

Donley has been named ACFA National Coach of the Year four times - once after each of his national championship seasons and once more after the 2004 season when his team also appeared in the championship game. For his coaching achievements, Donley has been inducted into several local, state and national halls of fame.

Early life and playing career
Donley is a native of Springfield, Ohio where he graduated from Shawnee High School in 1969. His playing career continued in college as a linebacker and fullback at Anderson College.

Coaching career

Anderson University
After graduating from Anderson University in 1973 with a bachelor's degree in physical education, Donley returned to his alma mater in 1976 to serve two seasons as offensive coordinator. In 1978, at the age of 26, Donley was named the youngest head football coach in the country. Over the next four years, Donley's teams compiled an overall record of 28–9 (.757), winning the conference title in 1980 and 1981. Through the 2017 season, which marked 71 years of Anderson Ravens football, Donley's winning percentage stands as the best among all head coaches in program history. In 1980, Donley earned a master's degree in education from Ball State University.

Georgetown College (KY)
Donley joined the Georgetown College staff as head coach in 1982. The high point of his tenure there came in 1991 when the Tigers went 13–1 and won the NAIA Division II Football National Championship. In the 14 games that season, the Tigers scored 744 points, among the most of all college football teams at all levels of play. For his team's achievements, Donley earned his first NAIA National Coach of the Year award.

California University of Pennsylvania
Donley served as the head coach at California University of Pennsylvania from 1993 to 1996. In four seasons, Donley's teams compiled an uncharacteristic record of 11–33.

University of Saint Francis (IN)
In 1997, Donley became the first head football coach at the University of Saint Francis. After a year of preparation, the Cougars began play in the 1998 season. In his first campaign, Donley led Saint Francis to a record of 2–8, their only losing season to date. Since 1999, his teams have lost more than three games only one time, in the 2014 season. Seven of Donley's squads have completed undefeated regular seasons (2002–2006, 2008, 2015), and three consecutive teams finished as national runners-up (2004–2006).

Donley led the Cougars to their first national championship win to end the 2016 season, coming 25 years after his initial championship at Georgetown.

Donley then led the Cougars to their second national championship win in 2017. Their achievement of back-to-back championships was only the fifth time in NAIA football history that this feat has been accomplished. The achievement also resulted in the naming of Donley as national Coach of the Year for both seasons - the third and fourth time he has received this honor (Donley was also named Coach of the Year after his 2004 team appeared in but lost the championship game.

Family
Donley has two children from Mary Mulford Donley, whom he married at Devington Baptist Church, Indianapolis, IN when he was a senior in college at Anderson University (m. 7/1/1972):. Currently, his son, Patrick, serves as Co-Offensive Coordinator and his step-son, Joey Didier, serves as Co-Defensive Coordinator for Donley's USF football team.

Awards and honors
 4-time NAIA National Coach of the Year (2017, 2016, 2004, 1991)
 4-time AFCA Region 2 (NAIA) Coach of the Year (2017, 2016, 2015, 2008)
 NAIA District 32 Coach of the Year (1991)
 10-time MSFA MEL Conference Coach of the Year (2015, 2013, 2012, 2008, 2006, 2004, 2003, 2002, 2000, 1999)
 2-time Mid-South Conference Coach of the Year (1991, 1989)
 2-time Hoosier-Buckeye Conference Coach of the Year (1981, 1980)
 20 conference titles in 39 seasons of coaching through 2017
 8 undefeated regular seasons (2017, 2015, 2008, 2002-2006) through 2017
 first coach in MSFA history to reach the 100-win plateau
 Inductee, NAIA Hall of Fame (2014)
 Inductee, University of Saint Francis Athletics Hall of Fame (Class of 2008)
 Inductee, Indiana Football Hall of Fame (2005)
 Inductee, Georgetown College Athletics Hall of Fame (Class of 2004)
 Red coat recipient, Mad Anthonys (2007)

NAIA career wins leader, milestone wins
Donley has more wins than any other NAIA head coach. Donley has attained this record while coaching three different NAIA football programs.

On November 26, 2016, Donley attained a milestone win in his career. With his team's victory in the quarterfinal round of the NAIA playoffs, Donley recorded his 300th victory as a head coach. Donley became only the 13th coach in college football history, at all levels of play, to have reached this plateau.

On November 25, 2017, Donley attained another milestone win. With his team's victory in the quarterfinal round of the NAIA playoffs, Donley recorded his 200th victory as the head coach of the Saint Francis Cougars. This victory came in Donley's 20th season as their coach.

With 326 wins at the end of the 2018 football season, Donley began the 2019 season in 7th place all-time on the college football wins list.

On November 2, 2019, Donley attained milestone victory #332. With his team's conference victory on the road against Lawrence Tech, Donley moved into a 6th place tie for all-time college football wins. The following week, the Cougars defeated Taylor University to give Donley sole possession of the 6th spot.

On October 30,2021, Donley attained milestone victory #338. This ties Ken Sparks for 5th place all-time on the Collage football wins list.

On September 10, 2022, Donley took sole possession of 5th place on the all-time wins list passing Ken Sparks with victory #339.

Head coaching record

See also
 List of college football coaches with 200 wins
 List of college football coaches with 100 losses

References

External links
 Saint Francis profile

1951 births
Living people
American football fullbacks
American football linebackers
Anderson Ravens football coaches
Anderson Ravens football players
California Vulcans football coaches
Georgetown Tigers football coaches
Saint Francis Cougars athletic directors
Saint Francis Cougars football coaches
Ball State University alumni
Sportspeople from Springfield, Ohio
Coaches of American football from Ohio
Players of American football from Ohio